Edward Edmund Maximilian George Windsor, Lord Downpatrick (born 2 December 1988), known professionally as Eddy Downpatrick, is an English fashion designer, former financial analyst, and relative of the British royal family. He is the co-founder and creative director of the British fashion label FIDIR. As second-in-line to the Dukedom of Kent, he uses one of his grandfather's subsidiary titles, Baron Downpatrick, by courtesy. A second cousin once removed of Charles III, Downpatrick is the most senior member of the House of Windsor to be excluded from the line of succession to the British throne due his Roman Catholic faith.

Early life and family 
Downpatrick was born on 2 December 1988 at St Mary's Hospital, London, and grew up in Cambridge. He is the eldest child of George Windsor, Earl of St Andrews, son and heir apparent of Prince Edward, Duke of Kent. Downpatrick's mother, Sylvana, Countess of St Andrews, by birth member of the Austrian Tomaselli family, is a Canadian born historian of Austro-Italian and French extraction. Diana, Princess of Wales, was Downpatrick's godmother, but she died before he got to know her well.

Downpatrick is close to his third cousin Princess Beatrice and to his younger sisters Lady Marina and Lady Amelia Windsor, a fashion model. His great-grandmother Princess Marina, Duchess of Kent, was the British royal family's fashion icon in the post-war era.

Education and career 
Downpatrick was educated at Eton College and matriculated at Keble College, Oxford, where he studied Modern Languages with a specialisation in French and German. At Oxford he was the president of the Bullingdon Club. He wanted to join the British Army after the university, but had not recovered from rugby injuries.

Downpatrick first had the idea to launch a fashion brand while hiking in Scotland in 2009, but decided to first focus on his studies and career as a financial analyst at JP Morgan. 

Downpatrick left JP Morgan and began working as a fashion designer in 2016. He is a co-founder and the creative director of the fashion label FIDIR, which he launched with Justine Dalby in 2017. The brand is a collection of outdoor-wear and accessories. He designs handbags, wallets, sweatshirts, wash bags, and T-shirts. His designs are inspired by the Scottish Highlands.

Succession rights 
In 2003, aged 15, following the example of his grandmother the Duchess of Kent and his uncle Lord Nicholas Windsor, Downpatrick, who was baptised in the Church of England, chose to be confirmed into the Catholic Church. He was therefore barred from the line of succession to the British throne according to the Act of Settlement 1701. As a second cousin once removed of King Charles III, Downpatrick is the most senior person excluded from the line of succession for being a Catholic. , he would have been 42nd in line. He remains second in the line of succession, after his father, to the Dukedom of Kent.

References 

Living people
1988 births
20th-century Roman Catholics
21st-century Roman Catholics
Alumni of Keble College, Oxford
British courtesy barons and lords of Parliament
Bullingdon Club members
Converts to Roman Catholicism from Anglicanism
English fashion designers
English people of Austrian descent
English Roman Catholics
Edward
JPMorgan Chase employees
People educated at Eton College